TRPE may refer to:
 Time-resolved photon emission
 Anthranilate synthase, an enzyme